Phước Tân is a ward located in Biên Hòa city of Đồng Nai province, Vietnam. It has an area of about 42.7km2 and the population in 2018 was 52,602.

References

Bien Hoa